Earl William Brannon (August 5, 1889 – December 1, 1952) was an American college football coach. He served as the head football coach at the First District Agricultural School—now known as Arkansas State University—from 1914 to 1917, compiling a record of 16–9–2.

Brannon graduated from the University of Nebraska in 1913. He died of a heart attack in 1952 in Ohio. at the time of his death he was working as a newspaper publisher.

Head coaching record

References

1889 births
1952 deaths
Arkansas State Red Wolves football coaches
University of Nebraska–Lincoln alumni
People from Thayer County, Nebraska